Mahallati Expressway() is an expressway in southeastern Tehran. It is from the east end of Panzdah-e-Khordad Street to Basij Mostazafin Expressway.

Expressways in Tehran